Karatoo may refer to:
Anglin J6 Karatoo, an Australian ultralight aircraft
Norman Aviation J6 Karatoo, a derivative of the Anglin J6 Karatoo